The 1986 Wake Forest Demon Deacons football team was an American football team that represented Wake Forest University during the 1986 NCAA Division I-A football season. In their sixth and final season under head coach Al Groh, the Demon Deacons compiled a 5–6 record and finished in a three-way tie for last place in the Atlantic Coast Conference.

Schedule

Team leaders

References

Wake Forest
Wake Forest Demon Deacons football seasons
Wake Forest Demon Deacons football